Amphimallon nigrum is a species of beetle in the Melolonthinae subfamily that is endemic to Spain.

References

Beetles described in 1835
nigrum
Endemic fauna of Spain
Beetles of Europe